Shara McCallum is an American poet. She was awarded a 2011 National Endowment for the Arts Fellowship for Poetry. McCallum is the author of four collections of poems, including Madwoman, which won the 2018 OCM Bocas Prize for Caribbean Literature in the poetry category. She currently lives in Pennsylvania.

Life and work
McCallum was born in Kingston, Jamaica, to an African Jamaican father and a Venezuelan mother. Her family migrated to the United States when she was nine. She graduated from the University of Miami, from the University of Maryland with an M.F.A., and from Binghamton University in New York with a PhD. She has taught at the Stonecoast MFA program.

McCallum directs the Stadler Center for Poetry and taught creative writing and literature at Bucknell University. McCallum is now a professor of English at Penn State University. She lives in Pennsylvania with her family.

McCallum's work has appeared in The Antioch Review, Callaloo, Chelsea, The Iowa Review, Verse, Creative Nonfiction, Seneca Review, and Witness.

Honors and awards
 1998 Agnes Lynch Starrett Poetry Prize
 Barbara Deming Memorial Fund grant
 Tennessee Individual Artist Grant in Literature
 2011 National Endowment for the Arts Fellowship for Poetry
Poetry fellowship from the National Endowment for the Arts.
Bynner award from the Library of Congress.
2018 OCM Bocas Prize for Caribbean Literature for poetry (for Madwoman).

Publications
Full-length poetry collections
 
 
This Strange Land (Alice James Books, forthcoming)
Madwoman (Alice James Books 2017)

Nonfiction
 

Anthology publications

References

External links
Magdelyn Hammond, "An Interview with Shara McCallum", Smartish Pace 
"Shara McCallum, Director of the Stadler Center for Poetry", YouTube
"For Rachel, Just before Speech", ars poetica
"The Art Room", Poetry Foundation
 
"The News", Cave Canem

Year of birth missing (living people)
Living people
21st-century American women
Agnes Lynch Starrett Poetry Prize winners
American women academics
American women poets
Binghamton University alumni
Bucknell University faculty
Jamaican emigrants to the United States
People from Kingston, Jamaica
University of Maryland, College Park alumni
University of Miami alumni
University of Southern Maine faculty
Writers in Jamaican Patois